This is a list of Florida Atlantic Owls football players in the NFL Draft.

Key

Selections

References 

Florida Atlantic

Florida Atlantic Owls NFL Draft